Somewhere, My Love is a 10" studio album recorded by American popular music singer Connie Francis.

Background
Produced as a special release for the German Bertelsmann Record Club, Somewhere, My Love is a compilation of English-language and German-language tracks recorded by Francis in May and June 1966.

The English recordings "Somewhere, My Love (Lara's Theme)", "Dance My Trouble Away" and "The Shadow of Your Smile" were taken from Francis' 1966 US album Movie Greats of the 60s while "Spanish Nights and You" was included as it had been one of Francis' most successful international single releases of 1966.

The German recordings "Malagueña", "Deine liebe (True Love)", "Heißer sand" and "Sag, weißt du denn, was liebe ist (Love Is a Many Splendored Thing)" had been included previously on the German album Melodien, die die welt erobern, Francis' first German-language concept album which had been released to tie in with her first German TV special of the same name.

The song "Es ist so schön, dass es dich gibt" was included as it was Francis' current single in Germany in June 1967 when the album was released.

Track listing

Side A

Side B

1967 albums
Connie Francis albums
MGM Records albums
Albums produced by Tom Wilson (record producer)
Albums produced by Alan Lorber
German-language albums